The Adventures of OG Sherlock Kush is an American adult animated comedy series that aired on FXX. The character is created by Joseph Carnegie and was first introduced on October 27, 2014 in a Season 2 episode of Lucas Bros Moving Co.

Season One premiered on FXX on January 1, 2015 as a part of the channel's Animation Domination programming block. The series aired an 11-minute special, The Mystery of The Royal Flasher, as a part of their 4/20 Block on April 20, 2015.

A second season was announced on January 29, 2016 and episodes began airing on exclusively on Animation Domination High-Def's YouTube Channel on February 1, 2016.

Plot
OG Sherlock Kush and Watson work together to solve London's toughest mysteries. Their plan almost constantly backfires because OG Sherlock Kush gets too high.

Cast
 Peter Serafinowicz - OG Sherlock Kush
 Rich Fulcher - Watson
 Chris Parnell - The Prime Minister / Jack The Ripper Jr.
 Ben Jones - Constable Jones
 Megan Amram - The Queen, Jaclyn Ripper
 Heather Anne Campbell - Maria
 Joseph Carnegie - Royal Guardsmen, Executioner, Evil Pig

References

External links
 
 https://www.imdb.com/title/tt4658484

2015 web series debuts
2016 web series endings
2010s American adult animated television series
American adult animated comedy television series
American adult animated mystery television series
American adult animated web series
American comedy web series
Television series by Fox Television Animation